Davíð Kristján Ólafsson (born 15 May 1995) is an Icelandic football player who plays for Swedish club Kalmar FF.

Club
He signed for Aalesund in 2019. He signed for Kalmar FF on 12 January 2022.

International
He made his debut for the Iceland national football team on 15 January 2019 in a friendly against Estonia, as a starter.

Acting
In 2006 he played Little Sportacus in LazyTown.

References

External links
 
 

1995 births
Living people
Davíd Kristjan Olafsson
Davíd Kristjan Olafsson
Davíd Kristjan Olafsson
Davíd Kristjan Olafsson
Association football defenders
Davíd Kristjan Olafsson
Aalesunds FK players
Kalmar FF players
Davíd Kristjan Olafsson
Norwegian First Division players
Eliteserien players
Allsvenskan players
Davíd Kristjan Olafsson
Expatriate footballers in Norway
Davíd Kristjan Olafsson
Expatriate footballers in Sweden
Davíd Kristjan Olafsson